Yuri Yuryevich Lebedev (born 21 January 1987) is a Russian football defender. He plays for FC Mashuk-KMV Pyatigorsk.

Career
Lebedev began his career at FC Kirovets St. Petersburg, then joined DYuSSh Smena-Zenit, before in 2005 he was scouted by Zenit, for which he played his first game on 15 July 2007 against FC Rostov.

External links
 
  Profile at stats.sportbox.ru

1987 births
Footballers from Saint Petersburg
Living people
Russian footballers
Russia youth international footballers
Russia under-21 international footballers
Association football defenders
FC Zenit Saint Petersburg players
FC Baltika Kaliningrad players
PFC Spartak Nalchik players
FC Petrotrest players
FC Salyut Belgorod players
FC Dynamo Saint Petersburg players
FC Luch Vladivostok players
FC Mordovia Saransk players
FC Nizhny Novgorod (2015) players
FC Nosta Novotroitsk players
FC Mashuk-KMV Pyatigorsk players
FK Jonava players
Russian Premier League players
Russian First League players
Russian Second League players
Russian expatriate footballers
Expatriate footballers in Lithuania
Russian expatriate sportspeople in Lithuania